Aso Rostam (born 1 December 1994) is a Kurdish Iraqi footballer who plays as a forward for Al-Shorta SC in the Iraqi Premier League and the Iraq national team.

International career
On 23 September 2022, Aso made his first international appearance with the Iraqi national team against Oman in the 2022 Jordan International Tournament. In 2023, Aso scored his first international goal against Saudi Arabia in the 25th Arabian Gulf Cup. On January 23, 2023, Aso scored a penalty goal that facilitated Al-Salmiya SC to advance to the quarterfinals of the Kuwait Emir Cup.

Career statistics

International goals
Scores and results list Iraq's goal tally first.

Honours

International
Iraq
 Arabian Gulf Cup: 2023

References

1994 births
Living people
Iraqi footballers
Iraq international footballers
Al-Shorta SC players
Association football forwards